Morten Jensen may refer to:

 Morten Jensen (long jumper) (born 1982), Danish track and field athlete
 Morten Jensen (footballer) (born 1987), German football goalkeeper for SV Elversberg
 Morten Jensen (sailor) (born 1951), Norwegian Olympic sailor
 Morten Haastrup Jensen (born 1989), Danish football goalkeeper for Vejle Boldklub
 Morten Jensen (ice hockey) (born 1997), Danish ice hockey player
 Morten Jensen (football coach) (born 1980), Norwegian football coach